Meeks is a surname. Notable people with the surname include:

Places
Meeks, Georgia

People
 Aaron Meeks, American actor
 Brian Meeks, Jamaican poet
 Dale Meeks, English actor
 David Meeks, Arkansas state representative
 Geoff Meeks, (b. 1949), British accounting scholar
 Gregory W. Meeks, African American congressman
 James Meeks, Illinois State Senator, Minister of Salem Baptist Church
 Jeremy Meeks (born 1984), American fashion model and convicted criminal
 Jodie Meeks, American basketball player
 Joseph Meeks, 19th century furniture maker
 Michael Meeks (disambiguation) 
 Quenton Meeks (born 1996), American football player
 Ron Meeks, American football player
 Stephen Meeks, Arkansas state representative
 Travis Meeks, American musician
 William Hamilton Meeks, III (b. 1947), American mathematician
 Randy Meeks, a character from the Scream films
 Shorty Meeks and Brenda Meeks, characters from Scary Movie

See also 
 Meek (surname)

 "The Meeks," a group of three women's basketball players at the University of Tennessee in the late 1990s who were key to the Lady Vols' three consecutive NCAA Women's Division I national championships: Chamique Holdsclaw, Semeka Randall and Tamika Catchings